Orria is a town and comune in the province of Salerno in the Campania region of South-western Italy. As of 2011, its population was of 1161.

History
The origins of town, around the 6th century, are uncertain, and possibly related to the destruction of the Ancient Greek city of Velia. Orria became an autonomous municipality in 1806, including also the town of Perito.

Geography
Located in the middle of Cilento, and part of its national park, Orria is a hilltown whose municipality borders with Gioi, Magliano Vetere, Monteforte Cilento, Perito, Salento and Stio. Its hamlets (frazioni) are the villages of Casino Lebano (pop.: 69) and Piano Vetrale (pop.: 475).

Demographics

Main sights
The palaces of the old town
The rural culture museum
The murales in the village of Piano Vetrale

Personalities
Paolo de Matteis (1662-1728), painter, born in Piano Vetrale

See also
Cilentan dialect

References

External links

 Orria official website
 Orria on comuni.italiani.it

Cities and towns in Campania
Localities of Cilento